Alta Badia is a ski resort in the Dolomites of northern Italy, in the upper part of the Val Badia in South Tyrol. It is part of the Dolomiti Superski ski area. It is included in the territories of the municipalities of Corvara, Badia, and La Val. The native language of the majority of the locals is Ladin.

Alpine Skiing World Cup

Alta Badia is a regular stop on the World Cup schedule, usually by the men in mid-December. Its giant slalom course, the classic Gran Risa, is one of the most challenging on the circuit. The race was won by Ted Ligety of the U.S., who also won two years earlier.

Nearby World Cup venues are Val Gardena to the west (over Gardena Pass) and Cortina d'Ampezzo (over Valparola Pass) to the east.

References

External links
  
Ski Map.org – Alta Badia

Alta Badia